Sindhi nationalism also known as Sindhi Nationalist Movement (Sindhi: سنڌي قومپرستي يا سنڌي قومي تحريڪ) was launched in the 1972 to separate Sindh from Pakistan. After Bangladesh became independent in 1971, G.M. Syed gave a new direction to nationalism and founded the Jeay Sindh Mahaz in 1972 and presented the idea of Sindhudesh; a separate homeland for Sindhis. G.M. Syed is considered as the founder of modern Sindhi nationalism. However, Sindh nationalists stand divided.

Total Independence of Sindh

The Sindhi nationalist movement's demands ranged from greater cultural, economic and political rights, to political autonomy, and to outright secession from Pakistan and the creation of an independent state referred to as Sindhudesh. It was founded by G. M. Syed in 1972 to separate Sindh from Pakistan. Sindhi separatists believe that the Sindhi people suffer from disenfranchisement at the hands of Pakistan's Punjabi majority. In 1972 G.M Syed, The considered founder of Sindhi nationalism formed an organization Jeay Sindh Mahaz. Later JSM divided into many fictions. Majorly two of these various political counterparts of Sindhi nationalism are JSQM and JSMM which believe in the political struggle

Militant acts 
Sindhi nationalists Sindhudesh Liberation Army is a militant organization of Sindhi nationalist parties in Sindh. The Sindhudesh Liberation Army became publicly known during the 2010, after it claimed bomb blast on railway tracks near Hyderabad, Pakistan. In October 2012, Sindhudesh Liberation Army was designated as terrorist organisation by the Government of Pakistan.

Rights for Sindh according to 1940 Resolution
In Sindh province many nationalist parties other than these separatist nationalist parties have been demanding for the rights of Sindhi people according to the 1940 Lahore resolution within the framework of Pakistan, it was demanded that Sindhis be given a separate state. Major parties those advocate this rhetoric are Awami Tehreek led by Rasool Bux Palijo; formerly worked with G.M. Syed but parted his ways after the Syed's call for a separate homeland for Sindhis. Sindh United Party led by G.M. Syed's grandson Syed Jalal Mehmood Shah and Sindh Taraqi Pasand Party led by Qadir Magsi.

Political parties 
Jeay Sindh Qaumi Mahaz
Sindh National Front
Sindh United Party
Sindh Taraqi Pasand Party
Awami Tahreek

See also
 Human rights abuses in Sindh
 Insurgency in Sindh

References

 
History of Sindh (1947–present)
Nationalist movements in Asia
Nationalism in Pakistan